Frater (lingua sistemfrater), an a posteriori international auxiliary language, published in Frater (Lingua sistemfrater). The simplest International Language Ever Constructed, in 1957 by the Vietnamese linguist Phạm Xuân Thái.

Phạm Xuân Thái gave it more than 6,000 words for the usage of a very extensive vocabulary.

Alphabet
This language uses 18 letters:
"a, e, i, o, u"
"b, d, f, g, j, k, l, m, n, p, r, s, t"

- help for best pronunciation:
"j" is pronounced as"z", "e" as "ei", and "o" as "ou".
All the other letters have their normal pronunciation according to the International Phonetic Alphabet.

Stress
The stress is placed on the last syllable of the word. Every letter is pronounced; there are no silent letters.

Grammar

Article
There is no indefinite article or definite article.

Personal Pronouns

Possessives are formed by adding the preposition ot before the pronoun. Unlike English that distinguishes three genders for the third-person singular pronoun, the pronoun was invariable.

Nouns
The noun in Frater is invariable. Plurals can be formed by adding -multi (many) to the end of the noun:

mensa (table) - mensamulti (tables)

Adjectives
The adjective in Frater is invariable and is always placed after the noun; except for cardinal numbers.

Numbers
The cardinal numbers in Frater:

1 - uni
2 - bi
3 - tri
4 - kuadri
5 - kuinti
6 - ses
7 - sep
8 - okta
9 - nona
10 - deka

11 - dekauni
12 - dekabi
13 - dekatri

20 - bideka
24 - bidekakuadri

30 - trideka
40 - kuadrideka

85 - oktadekakuinti

100 - senti
367 - trisenti-sesdeka-sep
600 - sessenti

1000 - mil
1000000 - milion

Ordinal numbers are formed by placing the cardinal number after the noun.

Verbs
The verb in Frater is invariable in person and in number.

The passive voice is formed by adding the auxiliary verb es before the infinitive: 
Ilis es trauma (they are wounded).

Syntax
The syntax in Frater is: Subject - Verb - Object.

Questions are formed by placing the verb before the subject.

Interrogative words include: antropkia (who), kia (what), plaskia (where), temkia (when), prokia (why), kak (how), and multikia (how much; how many).

Example

The Lord Prayer
For comparison the Lord's Prayer is provided in Frater, Glosa (a later auxiliary language with isolating grammar and Greco-Latin vocabulary), Latin and English.

References
 Pham Xuan Thai. "Frater (Lingua sistemfrater). The simplest International Language Ever Constructed". TU-HAI Publishing-House, Saigon (Republic of Vietnam), 1957.

External links
  Official website  (English, Esperanto, Interlingua) 
 
  (SCRIBD)

International auxiliary languages
Constructed languages
Constructed languages introduced in the 1950s
Isolating languages